A Danish pastry (sometimes shortened to just Danish, especially in American English) is a multilayered, laminated sweet pastry in the viennoiserie tradition. The concept was brought to Denmark by Austrian bakers, where the recipe was partly changed and accommodated by the Danes to their liking, and has since developed into a Danish specialty. Like other viennoiserie pastries, such as croissants, it is a variant of puff pastry made of laminated yeast-leavened dough that creates a layered texture.

Danish pastries were brought with immigrants to the United States, where they are often topped with a fruit or cream cheese filling, and are now popular around the world.

Composition
Danish pastry is made of yeast-leavened dough of wheat flour, milk, eggs, sugar, and large amounts of butter or margarine.

A yeast dough is rolled out thinly, covered with thin slices of butter between the layers of dough, and then the dough is folded and rolled several times, creating 27 layers. If necessary, the dough is chilled between foldings to ease handling. The process of rolling, buttering, folding, and chilling is repeated multiple times to create a multilayered dough that becomes airy and crispy on the outside, but also rich and buttery.

Butter is the traditional fat used in Danish pastry, but in industrial production, less expensive fats are often used, such as hydrogenated sunflower oil.

Terminology

The same etymology is also the origin of the Finnish  and Estonian  ("Viennese pastry").

History
The origin of the Danish pastry is often ascribed to a strike amongst bakery workers in Denmark in 1850. The strike caused bakery owners to hire workers from abroad, among them several Austrian bakers, who brought along new baking traditions and pastry recipes. The Austrian pastry of Plundergebäck soon became popular in Denmark and after the labour disputes ended, Danish bakers adopted the Austrian recipes, adjusting them to their own liking and traditions by increasing the amount of egg and fat for example. This development resulted in what is now known as the Danish pastry.

One of the baking techniques and traditions that the Austrian bakers brought with them was the Viennese lamination technique. Due to such novelties the Danes called the pastry "wienerbrød" (Vienna bread) and that name is still in use in Northern Europe today. At that time, almost all baked goods in Denmark were given exotic names.

Denmark

Danish pastries as consumed in Denmark have different shapes and names. Some are topped with chocolate, pearl sugar, glacé icing, and/or slivered nuts and they may be stuffed with a variety of ingredients such as jam or preserves (usually apple or prune), remonce, marzipan, and/or custard. Shapes are numerous, including circles with filling in the middle (known in Denmark as Spandauers), figure-eights, spirals (known as snails), and the pretzel-like kringles.

Varieties
In Sweden, Danish pastry is typically made in the Spandauer-style, often with vanilla custard.

In the UK, various ingredients such as jam, custard, apricots, cherries, raisins, flaked almonds, pecans, or caramelized toffee are placed on or within sections of divided dough, which is then baked. Cardamom is often added to increase the aromatic sense of sweetness.

In the US, Danishes are typically given a topping of fruit or sweetened cream cheese prior to baking. Danishes with nuts on them are also popular there and in Sweden, where often icing, and, sometimes, powdered sugar and chocolate spritzing are also added.

In Argentina, they are usually filled with dulce de leche or dulce de membrillo.

United States

Danish pastry was brought to the United States by Danish immigrants. Lauritz C. Klitteng of Læsø popularized "Danish pastry" in the US around 1915–1920. According to Klitteng, he made Danish pastry for the wedding of President Woodrow Wilson in December 1915. Klitteng toured the world to promote his product and was featured in such 1920s periodicals as the National Baker, the Bakers' Helper, and the Bakers' Weekly. Klitteng briefly had his own Danish Culinary Studio at 146 Fifth Avenue in New York City.

Herman Gertner owned a chain of New York City restaurants and had brought Klitteng to New York to sell Danish pastry. Gertner's obituary appeared in the January 23, 1962 The New York Times:
"At one point during his career Mr. Gertner befriended a Danish baker who convinced him that Danish pastry might be well received in New York. Mr. Gertner began serving the pastry in his restaurant and it immediately was a success."

Cartoon controversy 
During the Jyllands-Posten Muhammad cartoons controversy in 2006, several religious Iranian groups advocated changing the name of the highly popular Danish, given its name association with the source country of the offending cartoons. The Association of Iranian Confectionery Manufacturing designated "Roses of the Prophet Muhammad" as the new name for danishes made in the country as of 15 February 2006, although compliance with the proposed name in bakeries was mixed and short-lived. Related to this, many protesters in several Muslim countries, angered by the pictures of Muhammad, boycotted Danish goods. "Roses of Muhammad" is a traditional Persian synonym for a variety of pink rose flowering shrub.

See also

 Danish cookie
 Danish cuisine
 Doughnut
 List of doughnut varieties
 Kolach
 Kringle
 List of pastries
 Pan dulce (sweet bread)

Notes

References
Cauvain, Stanley & Young, Linda S. (2007) Technology of Breadmaking. Springer Science & Business Media.
Gisslen, Wayne (2013) Professional Baking. (6th edition) John Wiley & Sons, Hoboken, NJ.

External links

Danish pastry - base recipe - Danish pastry bar Kvalifood, a non-commercial educational cooking website from Denmark.
BBC Danish pastries
Danish

Danish cakes
Danish pastries
Danish cuisine
Austrian cakes
Austrian pastries
Austrian cuisine
Finnish cuisine
Norwegian cuisine
Swedish cuisine
Sweet breads
Foods featuring butter